Peter and the Wolf is an album adapting Sergei Prokofiev's Peter and the Wolf by Jack Lancaster and Robin Lumley released in 1975. It features a rock arrangement of Prokofiev's music. Performers on the album include Jack Lancaster, Robin Lumley, Gary Brooker, Bill Bruford, Phil Collins, Julie Tippett, Stephane Grappelli, Jon Hiseman, Brian Eno, Alvin Lee, Gary Moore, Cozy Powell, Manfred Mann, Keith Tippett, Viv Stanshall, and the English Chorale. This album is notable for featuring several musicians from Brand X, who would release their debut album the following year.

Track listing

Side One
"Introduction" – 1:05
"Peter's Theme" – 2:10
"Bird and Peter" – 0:38
"Duck Theme"" – 1:00
"Pond" – 0:46
"Duck and Bird" – 2:11
"Cat Dance" – 2:37
"Cat and Duck" – 1:32
"Grandfather" – 3:04
"Cat" – 0:34
"Wolf" – 0:46
"Wolf and Duck" – 3:46

Side Two
"Threnody For A Duck" – 1:51
"Wolf Stalks" – 0:57
"Cat In Tree" – 2:13
"Peter's Chase" – 1:45
"Capture of Wolf" – 1:27
"Hunters" – 0:58
"Rock and Roll Celebration" – 2:38
"Duck Escape" – 1:11
"Final Theme" – 5:07

Credits 
 Jack Lancaster — Lyricon, saxophones, clarinet, flute, violin
 Stéphane Grappelli — Violin
 Henry Lowther — Violin 
 Robin Lumley — Electric piano, acoustic piano, clavinet, string synthesizer, synthesizer
 Brian Eno — Synthesizer
 Manfred Mann — Synthesizer
 Gary Brooker — Synthesizer 
 Keith Tippett — Piano
 Gary Moore — Acoustic & electric guitars 
 John Goodsall — Guitar 
 Alvin Lee — Guitar 
 Chris Spedding — Guitar 
 Pete Haywood — Steel Guitar
 Percy Jones — Bass
 Andy Pyle — Bass
 Dave Marquee — bass
 Bill Bruford — Drums, snare
 Phil Collins — Drums, vibraphone, percussions
 Cozy Powell — Drums, cymbal
 Jon Hiseman — Snare drum 
 Erika Michaelenko — Chimes, choir 
 Julie Tippett — Vocal 
 Bernie Frost — Vocal, choir 
 Bob Sargeant — Choir 
 The English Chorale — Choir
 Viv Stanshall — Narrator

References

External links
 Jack Lancaster & Robin Lumley – The Rock Peter and the Wolf (1975) album credits & releases at AllMusic.com
 Various – Peter and the Wolf (1975) album releases & credits at Discogs.com
 Peter and the Wolf by Various Artists on Prog Archives

1975 albums
Rock albums by British artists
RSO Records albums
Peter and the Wolf